Thomas Robert Spear (15 November 1919 – 17 November 1968) was an Australian rules footballer who played with Hawthorn in the Victorian Football League (VFL).

Spear was captain-coach of Matong Football Club in 1950, who finished 5th on the ladder.

Notes

External links 

1919 births
1968 deaths
Australian rules footballers from Melbourne
Hawthorn Football Club players
Camberwell Football Club players
People from Hawthorn, Victoria